Ronnie Ward (born February 11, 1974) is a former American football linebacker. He played for the Miami Dolphins in 1997.

References

1974 births
Living people
American football linebackers
Kansas Jayhawks football players
Miami Dolphins players